Henry Frank Hagemeister (November 18, 1855June 27, 1915) was an American brewer, banker, and politician from Green Bay, Wisconsin.  He represented Brown County for eight years in the Wisconsin Senate (1901–1909) as a Republican, and for four years in the State Assembly (1893–1897) as a Democrat.

Biography

Henry Hagemeister was born in Green Bay, Wisconsin, in 1855, and educated in the parochial and public schools of Green Bay.  He would go on to work in brewing and banking, as the president of the Hagemeister Brewing Company, and president of Kellogg's National Bank.

He died on June 27, 1915, at his home near Sturgeon Bay, Wisconsin, and was buried in Woodlawn Cemetery in Allouez, Wisconsin.

Political career
Before being elected to the Assembly in 1892, Hagemeister was a member of the Green Bay city council and the Brown County board of supervisors, and was chairman of the county board while in the Assembly.  He served in the Assembly for two terms, and later in the Senate from 1901 to 1909. 

While in the Assembly, he was a member of the Democratic Party, but split with the party—like several other prominent Wisconsin Democrats—over the nomination of William Jennings Bryan and the party's turn toward populism.  He first joined with the "Gold Democrats" and then became a progressive Republican.

Running on the Republican ticket, he was elected to the Wisconsin Senate in 1900 and was re-elected in 1904, leaving office in 1909.

References

Politicians from Green Bay, Wisconsin
Wisconsin city council members
Wisconsin state senators
Members of the Wisconsin State Assembly
Wisconsin Democrats
Wisconsin Republicans
1855 births
1915 deaths
19th-century American politicians
Burials in Wisconsin